"It's a Beautiful Day" is a song written by Mike Love and Al Jardine for the American rock band The Beach Boys. The song was never released on an original Beach Boys album; however, it was released on the soundtrack to the film Americathon and as a single in September 1979 with B-side, "Sumahama". The song has also been released on the Ten Years of Harmony Beach Boys compilation album as well as the Made in California compilation.

Record World said that it "captures all the exuberance of a sunny day on a California beach."

Personnel
Credits via Craig Slowinski.

The Beach Boys
Brian Wilson – possible organ
Mike Love – vocals
Al Jardine – vocals, rhythm guitar
Carl Wilson – vocals, lead guitar
Bruce Johnston – backing vocals, possible piano
unknown – bass, drums

References

1979 songs
The Beach Boys songs
Songs written by Mike Love
Songs written by Al Jardine